This is a list of battle royale games, sorted chronologically. A battle royale game is an online multiplayer video game genre that blends last-man-standing gameplay with the survival, exploration and scavenging elements of a survival game.

List

Notes

References 

Timelines of video games